Buloychyk is a surname. Notable people with the surname include:

 Alyaksandr Buloychyk - Belarusian retired professional footballer
 Artsyom Buloychyk - Belarusian professional football coach and a former player

Belarusian-language surnames